Rachad Ahmed Saleh Farah (born in 1950) is a Djiboutian diplomat, ambassador to several countries, and the Permanent Representative of Djibouti to UNESCO.

Career 
He was the Ambassador of Djibouti to Japan from 1989 to 2004, and moreover, non resident ambassador to China, Singapore, the Philippines, Malaysia, India, Thailand and Australia. When he was the Ambassador-Designate in Tokyo still without the presentation of his credentials to Emperor Hirohito, this 124th Emperor of Japan who ruled for over 60 years died on January 7, 1989, and his imperial funeral was held on the next month. On February 24, Farah attended the Rites of Imperial Funeral with Barkat Gourad Hamadou, Prime Minister and Dileita Mohamed Dileita, Deputy Chief of Protocol and later Prime Minister.

After his departure from the Asia-Pacific region, since 2004, he has been the Ambassador of Djibouti to France, and also been non resident ambassador to  United Kingdom, Italy, Tunisia, Algeria, Portugal, Spain, Monaco and Iceland.

In 2013 Mr. Rachad FARAH was nominated as a candidate for the Director-General of UNESCO.

See also 
 Djibouti–Japan relations
 Djibouti-China relations

References

1950 births
Living people
Djiboutian diplomats
Ambassadors of Djibouti to Algeria
Ambassadors of Djibouti to Australia
Ambassadors of Djibouti to China
Ambassadors of Djibouti to France
Ambassadors of Djibouti to Iceland
Ambassadors of Djibouti to India
Ambassadors of Djibouti to Italy
Ambassadors of Djibouti to Japan
Ambassadors of Djibouti to Malaysia
Ambassadors of Djibouti to Monaco
Ambassadors of Djibouti to the Philippines
Ambassadors of Djibouti to Portugal
Ambassadors of Djibouti to Russia
Ambassadors of Djibouti to Singapore
Ambassadors of Djibouti to Spain
Ambassadors of Djibouti to Thailand
Ambassadors of Djibouti to Tunisia
Ambassadors of Djibouti to the United Kingdom